Bhilwara is a City, administrative headquarters in Bhilwara district of the Mewar region of Rajasthan, India. It has been termed as 'Textile city'.

History 
Stone Age tools dating from 5,012 to 200,000 years were found in Bundi and Bhilwara districts of the state.

According to substantiation, the present Bhilwara city had a mint where coins known as 'Bhiladi' were minted and from this denomination was derived the name of the district. And other tall story goes like this that the original Adivasi tribe known as Bheel helped Maharana Pratap in war against Mughal Empire king Akbar lived in Bhilwara region that's this area came to be known as Bheel+Bada (Bheel's area) Bhilwara. Over the years it has emerged out as one of the major cities of Rajasthan. Nowadays, Bhilwara is better known as the textile city in the country.

The oldest part of this town was set up in the middle of the 11th century by building a Krishna Radha mandir (temple)  that still exists and is known as the Bada Mandir. The area that is now known as Purana Bhilwara (Patwari Mohalla, Junawas, Manikya Nagar Malikhera). In mythology, there is also reference to Arjuna having fought here during the Mahabharata period.

Historical records show that a town named Mandal close to Bhilwara served as the military camp for the Mughals when they had conquered Chittaurgarh. The ruins of their campsite can still be seen today. A watch tower that was built on a small mound in Mandal is now a Devi temple.

Geography 
It has an average elevation of 421 metres (1381 feet). It falls between the districts of Ajmer (in north) and Chittorgarh and Udaipur (in south). Major rivers flowing through the district are Banas, Bedach, Kothari, Khari, Mansi, Menali, Chandrabhaga and Nagdi.

There is no natural lake in the district but there are the number of ponds and dams so the district is the most irrigated in the state of Rajasthan. It has a small man-made pond Mansarovar Jheel(Pond) near Azad Nagar which is a famous attraction and gets crowded on weekends.

Climate

Demographics 

 India census, Bhilwara has a population of 359,483. Males constitute 52% of the population and females 48%. About 13% of the population is under 6 years of age. Hindus constitute a majority of population with around 79.50% followers with Muslims (at 14.23%) and jains ( 5.47%) occupying second and third respectively

Economy 
Bhilwara is renowned in the world for its textile industry. The major industry is textiles, with more than 850 manufacturing units in the town. The main textile product is synthetic fabric used in trousers. It began with a spinning and knitting company named Mewar Textile Mills, owned by industrialist Shri Sampatmal Lodha, started in 1938. Thereafter Shri Laxmi Niwas Jhunjhunwala started his first unit for synthetic textile in 1961 at Bhilwara.Today the fabric manufactured in Bhilwara is exported to many countries around the world.

Infrastructure

Road connectivity 
National Highway No. 79 part of the Golden Quadrilateral ( six lane) and another National Highway No. 76 part of the East West Corridor (four-lane) pass through the district. The total length is 120 km.

National Highway No. 758 (Kota-Ladpura-Bhilwara-Gangapur-Rajsamand-Udaipur) passes through the district. The length of this highway is 146 km and other NH 148D (Bhim-Gulabpura-Uniara).

The total road length in the district was 3,883 km on 31 March 2000.

With a government bus depot in the heart of the city, Bhilwara is connected to all the important cities of Rajasthan and other states. Many private service providers are available. Bhilwara is well connected by road to capital city Jaipur and distance is 253 kilometre.

Rail transport 
The city is served by Bhilwara railway station. A broad gauge railway line connecting Ajmer, Jodhpur, Jaipur, Kota, Indore Junction, Ujjain, Delhi, Bharatpur, Agra, Gwalior, Lucknow, Kanpur, Allahabad, Patna, Kolkata, Chittorgarh, Udaipur, Mavli Jn., Ratlam, Vadodara, Surat, Mumbai and Hyderabad passes through the district. Kota (160 km) is the convenient railway station to provide connectivity to the southern states of Karnataka, Andhra Pradesh, Tamil Nadu and Kerala.

Ajmer (130 km) is one of major nearby railway station/junction for connectivity to other major cities like Delhi and Ahmedabad.

Air transport 
The nearest airport is at Dabok - Udaipur (165 km) — approximately 2.5 hours, by road. The other nearest airport is at Jaipur (251 km) which takes about 4 hours by road.

Recently, new Airport has started named Kishangarh Airport near Ajmer which is around 2Hrs, by road.

Culture 
Great Indian miniature artist Badri Lal Chitrakar highlights the city on international maps for Indian miniature art. He was given several awards including the Shilp Guru/Master Craftsperson award by the vice-president of India on 9 September 2006.
Bhilwara is famous for its 'Fad Paintings' which are depictions of traditional stories on cloth using naturally available colours. Bhilwara's Phad Artist Shree Lal Joshi contributed greatly in making and saving Phad Painting in whole India.

Attractions in Bhilwara include the Badnore Fort, Harni Mahadev Temple, Smriti van, Mansarovar Lake, Joganiya Mata Temple, Kyara Ke Balaji, Sanganer Fort, Meja dam and Pur Udan Chatri.

Education
Bhilwara has an autonomous engineering college of the Government of Rajasthan known as MLV Textile and Engineering College, which offers courses in engineering, including textile engineering and one Private University named Sangam University. There is also a medical college, Rajmata Vijaya Raje Scindia Medical College.

References

External links 
 
 

 
Cities and towns in Bhilwara district